Interstate 395 (I-395) in Washington D.C. and Virginia is a  spur route of I-95 that begins at an interchange with I-95 in Springfield and ends at an interchange with US Route 50 (US 50) in Northwest Washington, D.C. It passes underneath the National Mall near the US Capitol and ends at a junction with US 50 at New York Avenue, roughly  north of the 3rd Street Tunnel. Despite its proximity to I-395 in Maryland, the route is unrelated and unconnected.

I-395 is known by three different names over its various segments. The Virginia portion is part of the larger Shirley Highway that continues southward on I-95 beyond the terminus of I-395. In the District of Columbia, it is known as the Southwest Freeway from the 14th Street bridges to the Southeast Freeway interchange (I-695) and the Center Leg or Center Leg Freeway from the Southeast Freeway interchange to New York Avenue. The Southwest and Center Leg freeways are collectively denominated as the Dwight D. Eisenhower Freeway.

Route description

|-
|
|
|-
|
|
|-
|Total
|
|}

Virginia 

The intersection where I-395, I-95, and the I-495 (Capital Beltway) meet is called the Springfield Interchange. Unofficially, this interchange is referred to as the "Mixing Bowl". This moniker causes confusion, because the intersection of I-395, Washington Boulevard, and State Route 244 (SR 244; Columbia Pike) several miles north was historically known by that name and continues to be recognized by the Virginia Department of Transportation (VDOT) as such.

I-395 contains a third roadway: reversible, barrier-separated Virginia high-occupancy toll (HOT) lanes with their own entrances and exits, also known locally as the "express lanes", between South Eads Street near the Pentagon in Arlington County and SR 610 (Garrisonville Road) in Stafford County. During morning and evening rush hour, traffic on this roadway flows in the direction of rush-hour traffic.

This third roadway was built as a single-lane busway, the first in the US, before being expanded and converted to high-occupancy vehicle (HOV) use. A 2007 survey found that during the morning rush hour, the HOV lanes carry about 65 percent of travelers on I-395 (61,000 commuters), including 32,000 in transit busses and 29,000 in private vehicles with two or more people. The other 33,000 commuters (35 percent of total users) drove alone.

I-395 and US 1 cross the Potomac River from Virginia to Washington DC on three parallel four-lane bridges, together known as the 14th Street bridges. Potomac River crossings for the Washington Metro's Yellow Line and for a major CSX Transportation railroad line are immediately downstream here. This site has long been a major Potomac River crossing, with the first bridge constructed here in 1809. Of the present highway spans, the eastern one was built in 1950, the western one in 1962, and the central one in 1972.

District of Columbia 

After crossing the 14th Street bridges, the freeway has a left-side exit allowing access to US 1 (exit 1). The southbound side of I-395 has no access to northbound US 1 here. I-395 crosses East Potomac Park (exit 2) and a second bridge, the Francis Case Memorial Bridge over the Washington Channel. Here, the route bends from a generally northeast direction to a due east direction, interchanging (exit 3) with the 9th and 12th Street Expressways, two tunnels that carry traffic under the National Mall. A series of complex interchanges (numbered 4, 5, 6, and 7) provide partial access to Maine Avenue and C Street Southwest, as well as connections to I-695. Immediately after I-695, the freeway makes a hard turn to the due north to follow the 3rd Street Tunnel immediately under Union Square, just to the west of the US Capitol building and underneath the Frances Perkins Building. I-395 follows a depressed roadway (the Center Leg Freeway), which was placed underground in 2019, that has three more partial interchanges (exits 8, 9, and 10) with local streets before terminating at New York Avenue/US 50.

History

Shirley Highway

The portion of I-395 between the Pentagon in Arlington, Virginia, and the interchange with I-95 and the Capital Beltway in Springfield is part of the Henry G. Shirley Memorial Highway, named for the Virginia Highway Commissioner who died on July 16, 1941, just a few weeks after approving work on the new expressway. Originally SR 350, the full length of the Henry G. Shirley Memorial Highway was opened on September 6, 1949, from south of the Pentagon to Woodbridge, Virginia, along what is now better known as the I-95 corridor. The Henry G. Shirley Memorial Highway featured the nation's first reversible bus lanes, a precursor to today's HOV lanes.

During an evening rush-hour snowstorm in 1982, Air Florida Flight 90 crashed on takeoff from what was then known as Washington National Airport, hitting the easternmost of the three highway bridges known as the 14th Street bridges. The oldest span, formerly named the Rochambeau, is now named the Arland D. Williams Jr. Memorial Bridge, in honor of a passenger of Flight 90 who survived the crash, escaped from the sinking aircraft, and perished in the Potomac River while saving others from the icy waters. The center span is now called the Rochambeau Bridge and the western span the George Mason Memorial Bridge, after a US delegate to the Constitutional Convention.

Interstate Highway through Washington DC
Original plans called for I-95 to travel through Washington DC and Prince George's County, Maryland, toward the northeastern portion of the Capital Beltway, from which I-95 presently continues its northbound route. However, neighborhood opposition in DC halted this plan in 1977, diverting planned funding toward construction of the Washington Metro. The only remnant of the Maryland extension is a series of ramp stubs near College Park, which now lead to a park and ride. The portion of I-95 within the beltway became I-395, while the eastern half of the beltway was redesignated I-95 (and, later, cosigned I-95/I-495). I-395 terminates in Washington DC at a traffic signal at US 50, which is New York Avenue, near Mount Vernon Square.

Center Leg Freeway development/Capitol Crossing
The DC government finalized a deal in 2010 with Louis Dreyfus Company to construct a  mixed-use development in the airspace over the Center Leg Freeway portion of I-395. The $425-million (equivalent to $ in ) office, residential, and retail project at the east end of the Judiciary Square neighborhood will also restore the area's original L'Enfant Plan street grid by reconnecting F and G streets over the freeway. The project was awaiting final regulatory approval and expected to be complete by 2016.

In 2015, work began on I-395 in conjunction with Capitol Crossing, a major real-estate project in DC, part of which lies on top of the highway. The work involves adding a $200-million (equivalent to $ in ) concrete platform that connects neighborhoods that have been severed by the freeway, creating a better community atmosphere in the eastern edge of downtown. The District Department of Transportation (DDOT) expected the work would take up to four years.

Realignment
In January 2021, as part of an effort to eliminate driver confusion among I-395, I-695, and I-295 in Downtown, the American Association of State Highway and Transportation Officials (AASHTO) approved a request by the District of Columbia to eliminate the entirety of I-695 and renumber it as an extension of I-395. I-395's previous route along the Center Leg Freeway is to be renumbered as a new I-195. Although the Federal Highway Administration (FHWA) also approved the request on April 23, resigning work is yet to commence .

Express lanes conversion

In 2015, the commonwealth of Virginia announced that the HOV lanes between the Turkeycock Run bridge and Eads Street (at the Pentagon) would be converted to toll lanes as part of the I-395 Express Lanes Extension project. The existing HOV lanes, which ran in both directions in some areas, became reversible HOT lanes for the entire scope of this project, spanning .

Part of the project involved the reconfiguring of the Pentagon interchange to provide greater access to Army Navy Drive, as well as the closing of the onramp—from the southbound HOV lanes to the mainline Interstate southbound—located just west of the Pentagon interchange. All existing HOV interchanges within the project's scope became tolled.

Vehicles carrying three or more passengers are still able to use the former HOV lanes for free if they have E-ZPass Flex transponders in HOV mode. The express lanes opened on November 17, 2019. The lanes are operated by Transurban. The reversible portion runs toward the District of Columbia in the morning and toward Virginia in the afternoon.

Exit list
Exits in Washington DC were unnumbered until 2008. In 2014, in conjunction with the rebuilding of the 11th Street Bridges and the Southeast Freeway, some exit numbers were converted to a mileage-based numbering system.

See also

References

External links

 Kurumi - I-395 Washington, D.C.; Virginia
 HOV in Northern Virginia, from the Va. Dept. of Transportation
 Springfield Interchange reconstruction, from the Va. Dept. of Transportation
 Shirley Highway (I-395) at Steve Anderson's DCRoads
 Southwest Freeway (I-395) at Steve Anderson's DCRoads
 Center Leg Freeway (I-395) at Steve Anderson's DCRoads

95-3 Washington, D.C.
95-3
95-3
3 Washington, D.C.
Interstate 395
Interstate 395
Interstate 395
Interstate 395
Interstate 395
Tunnels in Washington, D.C.
Articles containing video clips
Road tunnels in the United States